Jiráček, female form Jiráčková, is a Czech surname.

Notable people with this surname include:

 Marta Jiráčková (born 1932), Czech composer
 Petr Jiráček (born 1986), Czech footballer
 Václav Jiráček (born 1978), Czech actor

See also
 Jiracek (disambiguation)
 Jireček (disambiguation)

Czech-language surnames
Patronymic surnames
Surnames from given names